is a Japanese mixed martial artist. She is competing in the Flyweight division of Bellator MMA. Kana Watanabe spent most of her career fighting in her native Japan, until she began fighting in Bellator MMA.

As of December 13, 2022, she is #7 in the Bellator Women's pound-for-pound Rankings and #2 in the Bellator Women's Flyweight Rankings.

Judo 
She started judo at the age of seven at Rinkai Juku. In his third year at Shibuya Kyoiku Gakuen Shibuya Junior High School, he competed in the 63kg category at the National Junior High School Judo Tournament, but lost in the third round. In her first year at Shibuya Kyoiku Gakuen Shibuya High School, she placed fifth at the National High School Championships, and in her second year she competed in the Kinwashi-ki competition, reaching the finals along with Nakamura Misato, a year her junior, but lost to Saitama Sakae High School, placing second. At the Inter High School Championships, she finished second in the individual competition, losing in the final to Wada Mami, a junior at Okatoyo High School, and third in the team competition. In the team competition at the National High School Championships, she played well with Nakamura and reached the final, but lost to Sanda Shosei High School, finishing second In her junior year, she won the Asian Junior Championships, but finished third at the All Japan Junior Championships.

In 2007 she went on to Tokai University, where she won the All-Japan Junior Championships in her freshman year. When asked by fellow judo player Nozomi Hirai, two years her senior, why Watanabe was nicknamed Pato, she tricked them into believing for several years that her real name was half-white, "Kana Watanabe Patricia". In reality, she was only called Pato because she looked like a parrot named Patricia that a friend of hers had. In her junior year, she placed fifth at the Kodokan Cup and competed in the weight division in her senior year, but lost in the first round to Ryotokuji Gakuen staff member Mie Tanaka in the Tomoe nage. She placed third in the student weight division.

In 2011, she became a member of JR East and took third place at the 2013 individual business championships. She then moved up to the 57kg weight class and contributed to the team's second place finish in the 2016 Jitsugyo team competition against Komatsu, defeating the previous year's Kodokan Cup winner, Ji Ishikawa, with a giai (a technique ari). He received the Outstanding Player Award on this occasion. At the Asia Open Taipei, she lost in the final to Eimi Kaneko of the Japan Self-Defense Forces Physical Education Academy, and finished second. She retired from judo and became a coach, but she felt that she couldn't continue to train athletes while still feeling like she hadn't done enough as an athlete, so after only three months, she quit as a coach. After that, she joined Fighter's Flow, which was run by Takao Ueda, a mixed martial artist she knew. At this time, she was described as a beautiful woman with a small face and a muscular body, but also flexible enough to perform leg openings and Y-balances. In 2017, she participated in KUNOICHI, a female version of SASUKE aired on TBS, twice in a row, both times achieving top results.

MMA career

Rizin / DEEP 
On December 3, 2017, in her mixed martial arts debut at DEEP Deep Jewels 18, she beat Hikari (Hikari Sato, Piroctetes Niigata) with an arm-hold crucifix, and appealed after the match to participate in RIZIN.  On December 29, 2017, she fought Shizuka Sugiyama at Rizin World Grand Prix 2017: 2nd Round and won a 3-0 decision.

On March 10, 2018, Kana Watanabe took part at Deep Jewels 19 event versus Yukari Nabe. The fight ended with draw. However, on June 09, 2018, she took a revenge at Deep Jewels 20 and won by Decision (Majority). On August 26, 2018, she won the fight versus Asami Nakai at Deep - 85 Impact event by Submission (Armbar) in Round 1. On December 31, 2018, she had a rematch against Shizuka Sugiyama at Rizin - Heisei's Last Yarennoka! and won by KO in 11 seconds of the match.

On March 08, 2019, Kana Watanabe won her fight versus Soo Min Kang at Deep Jewels 23 by TKO (Punches) in Round 1. On April 21, 2019, she fought Justyna Haba at Rizin 15 and won by unanimous decision. On October 22, 2019, she won the fight versus Hee Eun Kang at Deep Jewels 26 by Submission (Rear-Naked Choke) in Round 1. On December 29, 2019, she faced Ilara Joani at Bellator Japan's "Bellator x RIZIN" and won by TKO with back mount and pounding. In a post-fight interview, she said, "Next year, if RIZIN can make a women's flyweight belt, I want to challenge for that belt, and I also want to challenge overseas." She also said "I want to challenge for the women's flyweight belt in RIZIN next year, and I also want to challenge overseas.

Bellator MMA 
On December 10, 2020, it was announced that she had signed a multi-fight contract with Bellator. On April 2, 2021, she made her U.S. debut at Bellator 255 against Alejandra Lara. She won the bout via split decision. Watanabe faced Liz Carmouche on June 25, 2021 at Bellator 261. She lost the bout via TKO in the opening 35 seconds via a series of stand-up punches. It was her first loss in 12 career fights.

Watanabe faced Denise Kielholtz on May 13, 2022 at Bellator 281. She won the fight via a triangle choke submission in the second round.

Watanabe is scheduled to face Ilima-Lei Macfarlane on April 22, 2023, at Bellator 295.

Mixed martial arts record 

|-
|Win
|align=center|11–1–1
|Denise Kielholtz
|Submission (triangle choke)
|Bellator 281 
|
|align=center|2
|align=center|3:03
|London, England
|
|-
|Loss
|align=center|10–1–1
|Liz Carmouche
|TKO (punches)
|Bellator 261 
|
|align=center|1
|align=center|0:35
|Uncasville, Connecticut, United States 
|
|-
|Win
|align=center|10–0–1
|Alejandra Lara
|Decision (split)
|Bellator 255
|
|align=center|3
|align=center|5:00
|Uncasville, Connecticut, United States
|
|-
|Win
|align=center|9–0–1
| Ilara Joanne
| TKO (punches)
| Bellator 237
|
|align=center| 3
|align=center| 4:39
|Saitama, Japan
|
|-
|Win
|align=center|8–0–1
| Hee Eun Kang
|Submission (rear-naked choke)
| Deep Jewels 26
|
|align=center| 1
|align=center| 1:48
|Tokyo, Japan
|
|-
|Win
|align=center|7–0–1
| Justyna Haba
| Decision (unanimous)
| Rizin 15
| 
|align=center| 3
|align=center| 5:00
| Yokohama, Japan
|
|-
|Win
|align=center|6–0–1
| Soo Min Kang
| TKO (punches)
| Deep Jewels 23
|
|align=center| 1
|align=center| 4:33
|Tokyo, Japan
|
|-
|Win
|align=center|5–0–1
| Shizuka Sugiyama
|TKO (punch) 
|Rizin - Heisei's Last Yarennoka!
|
|align=center|1
|align=center|0:11
|Saitama, Japan
|
|-
|Win
|align=center|4–0–1
| Asami Nakai
| Submission (armbar)
| Deep: 85 Impact
|
|align=center| 1
|align=center| 4:20
|Tokyo, Japan
| 
|-
|Win
|align=center|3–0–1
| Yukari Nabe
| Decision (majority)
| Deep Jewels 20
|
|align=center| 3
|align=center| 5:00
|Tokyo, Japan
|
|-
|Draw
|align=center|2–0–1
| Yukari Nabe
| Draw (majority)
| Deep Jewels 19
|
|align=center| 2
|align=center| 5:00
|Tokyo, Japan
|
|-
|Win
|align=center|2–0
| Shizuka Sugiyama
| Decision (unanimous)
| Rizin World Grand Prix 2017: 2nd Round
| 
| align=center| 3
| align=center| 5:00
| Saitama, Japan
|
|-
|Win
|align=center|1–0
| Hikari Sato
| Technical Submission (armbar)
| Deep Jewels 18
|
|align=center| 2
|align=center| 1:32
|Tokyo, Japan
|

See also
 List of current Bellator fighters
 List of female mixed martial artists

References

External links 
  
  

1988 births
Living people
Japanese female mixed martial artists
Flyweight mixed martial artists
Mixed martial artists utilizing judo
Mixed martial artists utilizing karate
Bellator MMA champions
Bellator female fighters
Japanese female judoka
Japanese female karateka
21st-century Japanese women